Jan I may refer to:

 Jan I the Scholastic (1308/10 – by 1372)
 John I, Duke of Opava-Ratibor (c.  1322 – c.  1380 or 1382)
 Jan I van Brederode (1370/1372 – 1415)
 Jan I, Duke of Żagań (c. 1385 – 1439)
 Jan I Olbracht (1459–1501), King of Poland